Berroa is a monotypic genus of flowering plants in the aster family, Asteraceae, containing the single species Berroa gnaphalioides. It is native to South America (Uruguay, southern Brazil, northeastern Argentina).

References

Monotypic Asteraceae genera
Flora of South America
Gnaphalieae